The Jack Lamberson House, also known as the Maunu house, is a historic residence located in Oskaloosa, Iowa, United States.  It is one of seven Frank Lloyd Wright-designed Usonian houses located in Iowa, and one of two that were constructed in Oskaloosa.  Both were completed in 1951.  The Lamberson house is unique from the other Iowa Usonians for its extensive use of 60º and 120º angles. It features a low, sweeping pitched roof that makes the house look deceptively large, yet it is the second smallest of Iowa's Usonians.  It was listed on the National Register of Historic Places in 1988.

References

 Storrer, William Allin. The Frank Lloyd Wright Companion. University Of Chicago Press, 2006,  (S.305)

External links
Frank Lloyd Wright's Jack Lamberson House in Oskaloosa, Iowa
Lamberson House on iowaarchitecture.org
Lamberson House photos on flickr.com
Lamberson House on dgunning.org
SAH Archipedia Building Entry

Frank Lloyd Wright buildings
Houses on the National Register of Historic Places in Iowa
National Register of Historic Places in Mahaska County, Iowa
Houses in Mahaska County, Iowa
Houses completed in 1948
Oskaloosa, Iowa
Modernist architecture in Iowa